Todd Wilson may refer to:

Todd Wilson (organist), American musician
Todd Wilson (director) (1963–2005), American film director
Todd Wilson (security guard) (died 1991), American security guard killed in Father's Day Bank Massacre
Todd Wilson (skier), American former Nordic combined skier

See also